Mont Fleuri is an administrative district of Seychelles with its main part located on the island of Mahé. It also includes the six islands of the Sainte Anne Marine National Park and two islets further east (Beacon Island (Île Seche) and Harrison Rock).

Tourist attractions
 Sheikh Mohamed bin Khalifa Mosque

References

 
Districts of Seychelles
Victoria, Seychelles